Francis Xavier Caldwell (May 4, 1792 – June 5, 1851) was  a businessman and political figure in Upper Canada.

He was born in Detroit in 1792, the son of William Caldwell and grandson of Jacques Baby. He served with the British Army during the War of 1812. After the war, he settled on a farm in Amherstburg. In 1831, he was appointed customs collector and, in 1833, justice of the peace. In 1834, he was elected to the Legislative Assembly of Upper Canada for Essex; he was reelected in 1836. In 1835, he invested heavily in property near an ironworks in Essex County; the project failed due to the unstable financial climate and uncertainty related to the Upper Canada Rebellion. Caldwell also wound up assuming the financial responsibilities of another investor who fled to the United States. He had to sell much of his property to cover these debts.

He died in Malden Township in 1851.

External links
Biography at the Dictionary of Canadian Biography Online

1792 births
1851 deaths
British Indian Department
Members of the Legislative Assembly of Upper Canada
British Army personnel of the War of 1812
People from Amherstburg, Ontario
Politicians from Detroit
Canadian justices of the peace